The 2020 Scottish Labour deputy leadership election was triggered on 16 December 2019 following the defeat of Lesley Laird as MP for Kirkcaldy and Cowdenbeath in the 2019 United Kingdom general election. 
The result of the Deputy Leadership Election was announced on Twitter on 3 April 2020.

Background
The 2019 United Kingdom general election saw the Scottish National Party (SNP) regain 13 of the 21 seats they lost in 2017. One of those won was Kirkcaldy and Cowdenbeath, the seat of Scottish Labour Deputy Leader and Shadow Scottish Secretary, Lesley Laird. Despite the seat being a gain for the SNP, the new MP, Neale Hanvey sat as an Independent until May 2020 due to an investigation into anti-semitic posts online.

Procedure 
As with the previous leadership election, the election was held under one-person-one-vote from an electorate of members, affiliated supporters and registered supporters.

Leadership candidates needed to be an MP, MSP or MEP, and need the support of at least 15%, or five, of the thirty-two Scottish Labour MPs, MSPs.
They will also need nominations from 5% of local parties or three affiliates, including two trade unions, comprising 5% of affiliated membership, to get on the ballot paper.

Timetable

Campaign
Initially Jackie Baillie and fellow MSP Pauline McNeill were planning to run on a platform of job-sharing the role. However, it was found that this would not be possible due to the party's constitution. Pauline McNeill and Baillie subsequently stood separately in the election.

Following the close of nominations on 19 January, Dundee Councillor Michael Marra did not receive sufficient nominations to advance to the next round of the campaign. The same day, McNeill announced that she would also withdraw from the contest, leaving a two way campaign between Baillie and Matt Kerr.

Kerr has been described as left-wing, having strong ties with the trade union movement, and being a supporter of Jeremy Corbyn. Kerr supports the devolution of trade union and employment law, inclusive Constituency Labour Parties (CLP's) that are rooted in communities, open selections, and the creation of an accredited political academy to help develop new political talent.

Candidates 

† CLPs not nominating any candidate:

The following seven constituencies remain unaccounted for:

Results

References

External links
 2020 Deputy Leadership Election Hub on Scottish Labour's official website

Scottish Labour leadership elections
2020 in Scotland
2020s elections in Scotland
2020 elections in the United Kingdom
April 2020 events in the United Kingdom
Scottish Labour deputy leadership election